Air Mail is an album by the improvisational collective Air featuring Henry Threadgill, Steve McCall, and Fred Hopkins recorded for the Italian Black Saint label. The album consists of three compositions dedicated to the photographer Bobbie Kingsley, Ronnie Boykins, and Cecil Taylor & Jimmy Lyons.

Reception
The Penguin Guide to Jazz selected this album as part of its suggested Core Collection.

The Allmusic review by Ron Wynn awarded the album 4 stars, stating, "The Chicago trio Air was at a high point on this 1980 date".

Track listing
 "B. K." (Steve McCall) – 8:55
 "R. B." (Fred Hopkins) – 8:19
 "C. T., J. L." (Henry Threadgill) – 18:27
 Recorded at Right Track Studio, New York City on December 28, 1980

Personnel
Henry Threadgill – tenor saxophone, alto saxophone, flute, bass flute, hubkaphone
Fred Hopkins – bass
Steve McCall – drums, bells

References

1981 albums
Air (free jazz trio) albums
Black Saint/Soul Note albums